Bad Attitude is the fourth studio album by American singer Meat Loaf, released in November 1984. Recorded in Britain, it features two songs by Jim Steinman, both previously recorded, and a duet with Roger Daltrey. According to Meat Loaf's autobiography, he approached Steinman about writing the entire album, but waiting for new songs wound up taking so long that Meat Loaf recorded two previously released Steinman songs and moved on with other writers. The album concentrates more on the hard rock side of Meat Loaf, was a minor success around the globe and released a few hit singles, the most successful being "Modern Girl".

The US release in April 1985 from RCA Records features a slightly different track listing as well as alternate mixes for some songs.

The 30th anniversary re-issue by Cherry Red Records, released in 2014, contains only the original UK track listing and mixes.

Track listing

UK/Europe version

US version

Personnel

Production (US release only)
 Meat Loaf, Paul Jacobs, Bob Kulick — remixing (1, 2, 4, 5, 7)
 Harvey Goldberg — remixing (1, 2, 7)
 Josh Abbey — remixing (4)
 Tony Taverner — remixing (5)
 Mack — remixing (6)
 Simon Sullivan — extra recordings

Arrangements
 Paul Buckmaster, Paul Jacobs — string arrangements

Band
All track numbers based on UK listing. Adjust according to US release as necessary when referring to said list above.

 Meat Loaf — lead vocals
 Bob Kulick — guitars
 Paul Vincent — guitars (4, 6)
 John Siegler — bass
 Mo Foster — bass (5)
 Paul Jacobs — piano, keyboards, backing vocals
 Steve Rance — Fairlight programming
 Ronnie Asprey — saxophone (7)
 Wells Kelly — drums, percussion, backing vocals
 Curt Cress — drums (4)
 Frank Ricotti — percussion (3, 6)
 Roger Daltrey — additional lead vocals (1)
 Clare Torry — additional lead vocals (2), backing vocals
 Zee Carling — additional lead vocals (6)
 Stephanie de Sykes — backing vocals

Singles
Overseas, "Modern Girl" (UK #17), "Nowhere Fast" (UK #67), and "Piece of the Action" (UK #47) were released as singles with extended mixes and exclusive songs: "Take a Number", "Stand by Me" (a Ben E. King cover) and "Clap Your Hands". The latter two songs were recorded during the sessions for the Rocky Horror Picture Show soundtrack. 
"Surf's Up" was released as a US single and "Sailor to a Siren" was released as a double A-side with "Modern Girl".

Charts

References

1984 albums
Albums arranged by Paul Buckmaster
Arista Records albums
Meat Loaf albums
Albums produced by Alan Shacklock